Alexander Frei or Alex Frei (born 15 July 1979) is a Swiss professional football coach and a former player who played as a forward. He was most recently the manager of Basel.

He began his career at Basel, going on to various other clubs in Switzerland, France and Germany before returning to his home club, where he won the Swiss Super League title in all four of his seasons, including doubles with the Swiss Cup in 2010 and 2012.

Frei is the all-time leading scorer of the Swiss national football team with 42 goals in 84 games, and also their sixth-most capped player of all time. He represented the country at two UEFA European Championships and as many World Cups.

Club career 
Frei started his professional career with his hometown club of FC Basel, where he later was transferred to FC Thun, FC Luzern, and Servette FC, all in his native Switzerland. After a transfer to French club Rennes, he finished as the highest goalscorer in Ligue 1 for the 2004–05 season with 20 goals and was named Swiss Footballer of the Year the same season. He was also named Swiss Footballer of the Year in 2004 and 2007.

Frei then signed a four-year contract with Borussia Dortmund on 29 June 2006. Dortmund paid a transfer fee of approximately €5 million for him. In the 2006–07 season, Frei was the highest goal scorer for Borussia Dortmund with 16 goals in 32 matches.

He recovered from a long-term injury in the 2007–08 season to score six times in his last eight appearances for Borussia Dortmund. After speculation regarding his future, he came back to action against Schalke 04 in the fourth fixture of the Bundesliga. He scored two goals, equalising in an incredible game.

On 17 July 2009, he left Borussia Dortmund after 74 league matches and, after six years, returned to Switzerland to sign with FC Basel. He made his debut in a 2–1 win over FC Sion on 26 July 2009. He made an assist and also scored the last minute winner in the match at the Stade Tourbillon. During the 2009–10 season he scored 15 goals in 19 league games and FC Basel won the Double. During the 2010–11 season he scored 27 goals in 35 league games,  becoming the Swiss League Top goalscorer.

At the end of the 2011–12 season, Frei won his second Double with Basel, the League Championship title and the Swiss Cup.

In the 2012–13 UEFA Europa League, Basel advanced as far as the semi-finals, there being matched against the reigning UEFA Champions League holders Chelsea, but were knocked out being beaten 2–5 on aggregate. Frei's last game in this competition was as Basel qualified for the quarter-finals in the home game against Tottenham Hotspur, whom they beat 4–1 on penalties after a 4–4 aggregate draw to progress. Frei played his last professional match on 14 April 2013 in the home game at St. Jakob-Park as Basel beat Zürich 3–1. He led the team as captain for this game. He also scored his last goal, a free kick from about 25 meters in the 55th minute. He was substituted some ten minutes later to a standing ovation. At the end of the Swiss Super League season 2012–13, Frei was awarded his fourth championship medal and was awarded a Swiss Cup silver medal.

Between the years from 1997 to 1998 and again from 2009 to 2013 Frei played a total of 217 games for Basel scoring a total of 148 goals. 114 of these games were in the Swiss Super League, 15 in the Swiss Cup, 38 in the European competitions (Champions League and Europa League) and 50 were friendly games. He scored 74 goals in the domestic league, 13 in the cup, 22 in the European matches and the other 39 were scored during the test games. With the club he won four league championships and two cup titles.

International career 

Frei represented Switzerland at Under-18s, Under-19s and Under-21s levels. He played his Swiss U-18s debut on 25 October 1995 in the 5-1 away defeat against the French Under-18s. His Under-21 debut was on 3 September 1999 in the 3-1 away win against Denmark.

Frei played his debut as full international on 24 March 2001, being substituted in, during the 1–1 away draw against the Republic of Yugoslavia during the World Cup qualification Group 1 match. In the following match, four days later, Frei scored his first three goals for the national team in the 5–0 home win against Luxembourg.

Frei played for Switzerland at Euro 2004. In a group match against England, he was caught on camera appearing to spit at Steven Gerrard. Although no action was taken at the time, Frei was later charged and given a provisional 15-day suspension by UEFA.

He scored six times in 2006 FIFA World Cup qualification, including a second-minute penalty in the second leg of the play-off against Turkey which his team won on away goals. At the finals in Germany, Frei was Man of the match in the 2–0 group stage win over Togo in Dortmund, opening the scoring from Tranquillo Barnetta's 17th-minute cross. He concluded a win by the same score against South Korea in the next game to send Switzerland through as group winners. This goal was controversial as referee Horacio Elizondo overruled a judgement of offside by his assistant.

On 30 May 2008, in Switzerland's final preparation match before co-hosting UEFA Euro 2008, Frei scored twice in a 3–0 friendly win over Liechtenstein. This moved him to 35 goals for the Swiss national team, surpassing the record of Kubilay Türkyilmaz. However, within the first half of the opening match of the tournament, Frei was injured while captaining the Swiss team and missed the rest of the tournament due to a torn knee ligament in his left knee after a challenge from Czech defender Zdeněk Grygera. He decided to remain with the team to show his support. He later underwent surgery.

In a Euro 2012 qualifier at home against Wales, he was booed by his own fans throughout the match, even though Switzerland won the match 4–1. When he was finally substituted the fans in the home sector booed him repeatedly. On 5 April 2011, he decided to quit from the national squad after being criticised again following a 0–0 draw with Bulgaria on 26 March for the Euro 2012 qualifying match.

Sports director 
After Frei ended his career, he became new sports director of FC Luzern. This was announced by both FC Basel and Luzern on 19 March 2013.

Coaching career
He was interim manager of FC Basel. 

In September 2020, he became head coach of FC Wil 1900. He stepped down from this position in November 2021 and in December signed on as head coach of FC Winterthur. After successfully leading Winterthur to promotion to the Super League,  he was signed by his former club FC Basel to be their new head coach.

Frei and Basel parted ways on 7 February 2023, with the team sitting in seventh place in the table. According to FC Basel sporting director Heiko Vogel the 0–1 loss away to Grasshopper Club Zürich, following five league games without a win, on 4 February 2023, three days before, "was one defeat too many". On 1 February 2023, Basel had defeated Grasshoppers 5–3 in Zurich in their round of 16 match of the 2022–23 Swiss Cup.

Personal life 
Alexander is of no relation to club and country team mate Fabian Frei. However, he is the second-cousin of Seattle Sounders FC goalkeeper and former Swiss youth international Stefan Frei. His younger sister Andrea plays football for the Basel ladies team. He is married to Nina and they have a daughter born in 2012.

Career statistics

International 

Scores and results list Switzerland's goal tally first, score column indicates score after each Frei goal.

Managerial

Honours 
Servette
 Swiss Cup: 2000–01

Basel
 Swiss Super League: 2009–10, 2010–11, 2011–12, 2012–13
 Swiss Cup: 2009–10, 2011–12

Individual
 Credit Suisse Player of the Year: 2003
 Ligue 1 Golden Boot: 2004–05 (20 goals)
 Credit Suisse Player of the Year: 2004, 2005, 2007
 Swiss Super League Golden Boot: 2010–11 (27 goals), 2011–12 (24 goals)
 Axpo Super League Player of the Year: 2011, 2012
 Swiss Golden Player Award: "Best Forward":  2011, 2012

References

External links 

 
 
 
 
  
 Alexander Frei's profile, stats & pics 
 

Swiss men's footballers
Switzerland youth international footballers
Switzerland under-21 international footballers
Switzerland international footballers
Servette FC players
FC Basel players
FC Thun players
Stade Rennais F.C. players
Expatriate footballers in France
Borussia Dortmund players
Association football forwards
Footballers from Basel
Expatriate footballers in Germany
UEFA Euro 2004 players
2006 FIFA World Cup players
UEFA Euro 2008 players
Swiss Super League players
Ligue 1 players
Bundesliga players
FC Luzern players
Swiss-German people
1979 births
Living people
2010 FIFA World Cup players
Swiss expatriate sportspeople in France
Swiss expatriate sportspeople in Germany
Swiss football managers
FC Basel managers
FC Wil managers
Swiss Super League managers
Swiss Challenge League managers